The 2022 Arab Swimming Championships was the 5th edition of the Arab Swimming Championships and was held from 20 to 24 July 2022 in Bir El Djir, Oran, Algeria at the Aquatic Center of the Olympic Complex Miloud Hadefi.

Participating countries
12 countries took part in the competition:

Medal standings

Results

Men

Women

Mixed

References

External links
Program - novasport-dz
Results book

Arab Swimming Championships
Arab Swimming Championships
Arab Swimming Championships
Swimming competitions in Algeria
Arab Swimming Championships
Swimming